Marko Tomasović (born November 10, 1981) is a Croatian Boxer and Kickboxer, best known to qualify for the Olympics 2008 at super heavyweight.

Career

In 2005 Marko entered the W.A.K.O. World Amateur Kickboxing Championships in Szeged, Hungary where he made it to the final of the heavyweight division (91 kg/200.2 lbs) in Full-Contact - only to lose out on a gold medal against Denys Simkin.  As an amateur boxer in 2007 Marko made it to the 2007 World Championships where he lost his first bout to David Price.  He also returned to kickboxing that year with W.A.K.O. for the world championships in Coimbra, Portugal making the final of the super heavyweight division and winning a silver medal.  At the Olympic qualifications he defeated Kurban Günebakan, got a walkover over Magomed Abdusalamov and surprisingly beat Robert Helenius 16:7, thus qualifying for Beijing.  In Beijing at the Summer Olympics he ran right into Italian world champion Roberto Cammarelle and lost his debut.

Titles
Professional Kickboxing
 2006 K-1 Hungary runner up
 2006 W.A.K.O. Pro Full-Contact Rules European Champion (1 title defence)

Amateur Kickboxing
2010 W.A.K.O. European Championships in Loutraki, Greece  +91 kg (Full-Contact)
2007 W.A.K.O. World Championships in Coimbra, Portugal  +91 kg (Full-Contact) 
2005 W.A.K.O. World Championships in Szeged, Hungary  -91 kg (Full-Contact)

Fight record

|-  bgcolor="#FFBBBB"
| 2010-09-25 || Loss ||align=left| Marin Došen || Fight Night  || Viškovo, Croatia || Decision (Unanimous) || 3 || 2:00
|-
|- bgcolor="#FFBBBB"
| 2010-06-12 || Loss ||align=left| Damian Garcia  ||  || Palma, Majorca, Spain || KO || 4||
|-
! style=background:white colspan=9 |
|-
|- bgcolor="#CCFFCC"
| 2010-03-27 || Win ||align=left| Adis Dadović  || Obračun u Ringu 10  || Split, Croatia || TKO || 2|| 
|-  bgcolor="#CCFFCC"
| 2009-03-21 || Win ||align=left| Milan Dašić || K-1 ColliZion 2009 Croatia || Split, Croatia || Decision (Unanimous) || 3 || 3:00
|-

|-  bgcolor="#CCFFCC"
| 2007-01-20 || Win ||align=left| Agostino Pavesi ||  || Milano, Italy || Decision  || 10 || 2:00
|-
! style=background:white colspan=9 |
|-
|-  bgcolor="#FFBBBB"
| 2006-08-18 || Loss ||align=left| Zabit Samedov || K-1 Hungary 2006 || Debrecen, Hungary || KO || 1 || 
|-
! style=background:white colspan=9 |
|-
|-  bgcolor="#CCFFCC"
| 2006-08-18 || Win ||align=left| Zinedine Hameur-Lain || K-1 Hungary 2006 || Debrecen, Hungary ||  ||  || 
|-  bgcolor="#CCFFCC"
| 2006-08-18 || Win ||align=left| Gabor Meizster || K-1 Hungary 2006 || Debrecen, Hungary ||  ||  || 
|-  bgcolor="#CCFFCC"
| 2006-04-29 || Win ||align=left| Balasz Varga || Obračun u Ringu IV || Split, Croatia || Decision (Unanimous) || 10 || 2:00
|-
! style=background:white colspan=9 |

|-
| colspan=9 | Legend:    

|-  bgcolor="#CCFCC"
| 2010-11-27 || Win ||align=left| Wojciech Jastrzębski || W.A.K.O European Championships 2010, Full-Contact Final +91 kg || Loutraki, Greece || Decision (Split) || 3 || 2:00
|-
! style=background:white colspan=9 |
|-
|-  bgcolor=
| 2010-11-25 || WO ||align=left| Damon Jeremy || W.A.K.O European Championships 2010, Full-Contact Semi Finals +91 kg || Loutraki, Greece || WO (No fight) ||  || 
|-  bgcolor="#CCFFCC"
| 2010-11-22 || Win ||align=left| Tomaš Možny || W.A.K.O European Championships 2010, Full-Contact Quarter Finals +91 kg || Loutraki, Greece || Decision (Unanimous) || 3 || 2:00
|-  bgcolor="#CCFFCC"
| 2010-11-25 || Win ||align=left| Kadir Yirdilim || W.A.K.O European Championships 2010, Full-Contact First Round +91 kg || Loutraki, Greece || Decision (Unanimous) || 3 || 2:00

|-  bgcolor="#FFBBBB"
| 2007-12 || Loss ||align=left| Alexey Tokarev || W.A.K.O European Championships 2007, Full-Contact Final +91 kg || Coimbra, Portugal || Decision (Unanimous) || 3 || 2:00
|-
! style=background:white colspan=9 |
|-
|-  bgcolor="#CCFFCC"
| 2007-11 || Win ||align=left| Jukka Saarinen || W.A.K.O European Championships 2007, Full-Contact Semi Finals +91 kg || Coimbra, Portugal || Decision (Split) || 3 || 2:00
|-  bgcolor="#CCFFCC"
| 2007-11 || Win ||align=left| Hafiz Bahshhalyev || W.A.K.O European Championships 2007, Full-Contact Quarter Finals +91 kg || Coimbra, Portugal || Decision (Split) || 3 || 2:00
|-  bgcolor="#CCFFCC"
| 2007-11 || Win ||align=left| Eddie Theron || W.A.K.O European Championships 2007, Full-Contact 1st Round +91 kg || Coimbra, Portugal || Decision (Split) || 3 || 2:00
|-
|-  bgcolor="#FFBBBB"
| 2005-12 || Loss ||align=left| Denis Simkin || W.A.K.O European Championships 2005, Full-Contact Final -91 kg || Szeged, Hungary ||  ||  || 
|-
! style=background:white colspan=9 |
|-
|-  bgcolor="#CCFFCC"
| 2005-12 || Win ||align=left| Balazs Varga || W.A.K.O European Championships 2005, Full-Contact Semi Finals -91 kg || Szeged, Hungary || ||  ||

|-
| colspan=9 | Legend:

References

External links
Qualifier

Croatian male kickboxers
Olympic boxers of Croatia
Boxers at the 2008 Summer Olympics
Living people
Heavyweight boxers
1981 births
Croatian male boxers
Mediterranean Games silver medalists for Croatia
Competitors at the 2009 Mediterranean Games
Mediterranean Games medalists in boxing